Adam Harding (born 3 January 1993) is a Welsh professional ice hockey player currently playing for Bristol Pitbulls, who he joined in 2022.

Harding previously played for EIHL sides Cardiff Devils, Manchester Storm, and Dundee Stars and was briefly contracted to Milton Keynes Lightning in the 2018 off-season before opting to move to Swindon.

After nearly four years with Basingstoke Bison, Harding moved to fellow NIHL side Bristol Pitbulls ahead of the 2022–23 season - joining as player/assistant coach.

References

External links

1993 births
Living people
Sportspeople from Cardiff
Cardiff Devils players
Swindon Wildcats players
Manchester Storm (2015–) players
Dundee Stars players
Basingstoke Bison players
Bristol Pitbulls players
Welsh ice hockey forwards